Greece sent 12 athletes to the 1978 European Athletics Championships which took place 29 August–3 September 1978 in Prague. Greece won no medals at the Championships.

References 

Nations at the 1978 European Athletics Championships
Greece at the European Athletics Championships
1978 in Greek sport